Mordellistena celebensis is a beetle in the genus Mordellistena of the family Mordellidae. It was described in 1925 by Maurice Pic.

References

celebensis
Beetles described in 1925